Juli Kumari Mahato (Nepali: जुली कुमारी महतो) (also spelt Juli Kumari Mahato) is a Nepali communist politician. She is a member of the House of Representatives of the federal parliament of Nepal and the former Minister of Women, Children and Senior Citizens . She was elected from CPN UML under the proportional representation system.

In the 2013 elections for the second constituent assembly, she was a candidate for CPN UML from Dhanusa-3 constituency. She was elected a member of Pratinidhi Sabha from the same constituency in 2022 Nepalese general election by defeating Anil Kumar Jha of LSP-N. 

A long time member of CPN UML, she was appointed a "Co-Incharge" of Dhanusa district for Nepal Communist Party (NCP), the new party formed by the merger of CPN UML and CPN (Maoist Centre), in 2019.

Electoral history

2013 Constituent Assembly election

References

Living people
21st-century Nepalese women politicians
21st-century Nepalese politicians
Communist Party of Nepal (Unified Marxist–Leninist) politicians
Members of the 1st Nepalese Constituent Assembly
1976 births
Nepal MPs 2022–present